Effie Conley (November 7, 1882 – August 8, 1967) was an American dancer and actress who toured the vaudeville circuit with partner Fred Warren and appeared in silent films. Their vaudeville performances were well received.

Early life and family

Conley was born in Massachusetts in 1882. Her sister Ann Conley married Maxwell Karger.

The University of Washington Libraries have a photo of her and Fred Warren from 1916 and in performing attire in 1923. She and her husband were in the 1919 film A Favor to a Friend together.

Death and legacy
Conley died in 1967 in Van Nuys, California.

Selected filmography
A Favor to a Friend (1919) as Gloria Morning 
Fair and Warmer (1919), as Tessie
The Four Flusher (1919), as Senora Flora
Blind Man's Eyes (1919)
The Walk-Offs (1920), as Caroline Rutherford
The Best of Luck (1920), as Maid
The Fatal Hour (1920), as Sally
 Garments of Truth (1921)

References

External links

1882 births
1962 deaths
American silent film actresses
20th-century American actresses
Vaudeville performers